Herederos de una venganza (International Title: Legacy of Revenge) is a 2011 Argentine telenovela aired by Channel 13 in the prime time. The characters inhabit a small fictional village named Vidisterra. The cast includes Luciano Castro, Romina Gaetani, Marcela Kloosterboer, Federico Amador, Leonor Benedetto, Rodolfo Ranni, Antonio Grimau, Daniel Kuzniecka, Marco Antonio Caponi, and Betiana Blum.

Creation
Channel 13 had great success in 2009 and 2010 with Valientes and Malparida, primetime telenovelas with vengeance plots and a dramatic genre. Luciano Castro, lead actor from Valientes, was again lead actor for this project, along with Romina Gaetani, who worked at another successful 2010 dramatic telenovela, Botineras.

Production started on November 2010. The initial scenes in the highway were filmed at the highways near Pilar. The wedding of Antonio and Angie, one of the plot starting points, was filmed during three days at Bella Vista, and was followed by filmings at scenarios.

Plot
The telenovela takes place in the fictional Argentine village of Vidisterra. All local wineries were combined into a single one, owned by Regina Piave and the mayor Octavio Capogreco. Wine is the village's most important product, giving great power to the owners of the winery. Regina, Octavio and other influential people of the village are also members of a secret lodge aiming to survive a potential end of the world. The main male character, Antonio Puentes, was about to get married at Vidisterra, but his wife died in an unclear murder promoted by the lodge. He finally stays in the village, as heir of his fiancee's sharings in the winery. The main female character is Mercedes Leiva, who was in prison for killing an abusive spouse, but as her husband was popular in the village, she is rejected by most people once released from prison.

Reception
The telenovela was first aired on January 17, 2011. Telefe opposed it with another telenovela in the same time, El elegido. Initial ratings were higher for "Herederos...", with nearly 25 points over 19.

Cast

References

External links
 Official site 

2010s Argentine drama television series
2011 telenovelas
2012 telenovelas
2011 Argentine television series debuts
2012 Argentine television series endings
Freemasonry in fiction
Argentine telenovelas
Spanish-language telenovelas
Pol-ka telenovelas
Television series about wine
Spanish-language television shows